{{DISPLAYTITLE:C21H22O5}}
The molecular formula C21H22O5 (molar mass: 354.39 g/mol, exact mass: 354.146724 u) may refer to:

 Xanthohumol, a prenylated chalconoid
 Isoxanthohumol, a prenylated flavanone

Molecular formulas